Pilkington Recreation F.C. was an English association football club based in Kirk Sandall, Doncaster, South Yorkshire.

History
Little is known of the club's early years – they first came to the public eye when they played in the FA Cup in 1927, entering the competition every year up to the outbreak of the Second World War. After the war, they joined the Sheffield Association League for two years while again playing in the FA Cup, but it is not known what happened to the club between 1952 and 1976.

In 1976 they entered the Yorkshire League – a year later they first entered the FA Vase. In 1982 they joined the newly formed Northern Counties East League, but their spell in this competition was troubled, and in 1991 they resigned from the league and disbanded after finishing bottom of the basement division for the second successive season.

League and cup history

Honours

League
'''Yorkshire League Division Three
Promoted: 1979–80

Cup
None

Records
Best FA Cup performance: 2nd Qualifying Round, 1929–30
Best FA Amateur Cup performance: 1st Round, 1928–29, 1929–30
Best FA Vase performance: 3rd Round, 1982–83

References

Defunct football clubs in England
Defunct football clubs in South Yorkshire
Doncaster & District Senior League
Sheffield Association League
Yorkshire Football League
Northern Counties East Football League